"Holy Forever" is a song by American contemporary Christian musician Chris Tomlin. It will air on Christian radio in the United States on March 10, 2023, as the fourth single from Tomlin's fourteenth studio album, Always (2022). Tomlin co-wrote the song with Brian Johnson, Jason Ingram, Jenn Johnson, and Phil Wickham. Jonathan Smith handled the production of the single.

"Holy Forever" peaked at No. 26 on the US Hot Christian Songs chart published by Billboard. It was nominated for the Grammy Award for Best Contemporary Christian Music Performance/Song at the 2023 Grammy Awards.

Background
On July 15, 2022, Chris Tomlin announced that he will be releasing a new worship project titled Always on September 9, releasing "Holy Forever" as the first promotional single from the album. "Holy Forever" followed the previously released singles "I See You," "Always," and "Yahweh (No One)."

Composition

Reception

Critical response
Jonathan Andre in his 365 Days of Inspiring Media review spotlighted the track as one of three songs to listen to on Always, opining that ""Holy Forever' is my favourite song from Chris Tomlin’s Always, as this track becomes my favourite Chris Tomlin ballad, ever since "Jesus" way back in 2016." Timothy Yap of JubileeCast gave a positive review of the album, saying, "Solely focused on God in his glorious splendor surrounded with a soul-stirring chorus, this reminds us of the type of worship mentioned in Revelation 4 and 5." Gerod Bass of Worship Musician magazine wrote a positive review of the song, saying it "touches on the ever faithful theme with its soaring chorus notes and reverent and honest worship."

Accolades

Commercial performance
"Holy Forever" debuted at No. 43 on the US Hot Christian Songs chart dated July 30, 2022.

Music video
The official lyric video of "Holy Forever" was published via Chris Tomlin's YouTube channel on March 29, 2022.

Track listing

Personnel
Adapted from AllMusic.

 Jacob Arnold — drums, percussion
 Adam Ayan — mastering engineer
 Jonsal Barrientes — choir/chorus
 Dallan Beck — editing
 Jesse Brock — mixing assistant
 Chris Brown — background vocals, choir/chorus
 Shantay Brown — choir/chorus
 Daniel Carson — acoustic guitar, choir/chorus, electric guitar
 Tamera Chipp — choir/chorus
 Chad Chrisman — A&R
 Courtlan Clement — electric guitar
 Nickie Conley — background vocals
 Elevation Worship — primary artist
 Enaka Enyong — choir/chorus
 Jason Eskridge — background vocals
 Bryan Fowler — acoustic guitar, background vocals, bass, electric guitar, keyboards, producer, programmer, synthesizer programming
 Sam Gibson — mixing
 Ben Glover — acoustic guitar, background vocals, choir/chorus, electric guitar, engineer, keyboards, producer, programming
 Lindsay Glover — choir/chorus
 Tarik Henry — choir/chorus
 Mark Hill — bass
 Tiffany Hudson — choir/chorus
 Tommy Iceland — choir/chorus
 Jenn Johnson — background vocals
 Taylor Johnson — acoustic guitar, electric guitar
 Graham King — engineer
 Benji Kurokose — choir/chorus
 Brandon Lake — primary artist, vocals
 Paul Mabury — drums
 Jerry McPherson — electric guitar
 Matthew Melton — bass
 Buckley Miller — recording
 Sean Moffitt — mixing
 Gordon Mote — piano
 Brad O'Donnell — A&R
 Colton Price — editing, programming
 David Ramirez — programming
 Sophie Shear — choir/chorus
 Jonathan Smith — background vocals, Hammond B3, organ, piano, producer, programming
 Jeff Sojka — background vocals, choir/chorus, drums, electric guitar, engineer, keyboards, producer, programming
 Isaiah Templeton — choir/chorus
 Chris Tomlin — choir/chorus, primary artist, vocals
 Bria Valderama — choir/chorus
 Doug Weier — mixing
 Jordan Welch — choir/chorus

Charts

Release history

References

External links
  on PraiseCharts

 

2022 singles
2022 songs
Chris Tomlin songs